This is a list of bridges and other crossings of the Cedar River from Lake Washington upstream to Chester Morse Lake in the foothills of the Cascade Mountains.

Crossings

City of Renton
Crossings in city limits of Renton, Washington
River mile (RM) 0 - Boeing North Bridge: Boeing Renton Factory to Renton Municipal Airport taxiway
RM 0.75 - Boeing South Bridge, Boeing Renton Factory
Logan Ave RM 1.1
Williams Ave
Wells Ave
Bronson Way RM 1.5
Renton Public Library
Cedar River Trail pedestrian bridge at Liberty Park
Houser Way
BNSF Railroad
I-405 (southbound) RM 1.6
Cedar River Trail trail access pedestrian bridge (under I-405) at Cedar River Park
I-405 (northbound) RM 1.6
BNSF - Cedar River Bridge BH 53074 
Wooden bridge RM 2.9 (no name in KC doc) prob SE 5th at Cedar River Natural Zone 
Cedar River Trail Bridge #1 BH 53075 
Cedar River Trail Bridge #2 BH 53697 
Milwaukee Road Railroad - Cedar River Bridge #2 (SE 252nd Place) BH 53695 
Cedar River Trail
RM 4.2 SR 169 aka Maple Valley Highway 
Maplewood Golf Course golf cart bridge

King County
Crossings in King County, Washington outside Renton
RM 5.0 Elliot (Lower Jones Road [154th Place SE]) Bridge
RM 9.2 Jones Road Bridge
RM 11.4 Cedar Grove Road Bridge
Cedar River Trail Bridge #3 BH 53698 
RM 13.8-14.7 SR 18  and SR 169 
Cedar River Trail Bridge #4 BH 53699 
RM 16 Cedar River Trail Bridge #5 BH 53700 
RM 17 Cedar River Trail Bridge #6 BH 53701 
RM 19.6 Cedar River Trail Bridge #7 BH 53696 
Landsburg Dam (RM 21.7) 
RM 29.3 Barneston Bridge 
Milwaukee Road Railroad - Cedar River Bridge #1 (Milwaukee Road RR off Cedar Falls Road - fmr Cedar Falls Depot) BH 53694 
Masonry Dam at Chester Morse Lake

Footnotes

References

 (Appendix A-1 river mile index for lower Cedar R.)

External links

King County bridges at uglybridges.com

Cedar River